Take 6 is an American a cappella gospel sextet formed in 1980 on the campus of Oakwood College in Huntsville, Alabama. The group integrates jazz with spiritual and inspirational lyrics. Take 6 has received several Grammy Awards as well as Dove Awards, a Soul Train Award and nominations for the NAACP Image Award. 

The band has worked with Ray Charles, Nnenna Freelon, Gordon Goodwin, Don Henley, Whitney Houston, Al Jarreau, Quincy Jones, k.d. lang, Queen Latifah, The Manhattan Transfer, Johnny Mathis, Brian McKnight, Luis Miguel, Marcus Miller, Joe Sample, Ben Tankard, Randy Travis, CeCe Winans, Stevie Wonder and Jacob Collier. All original members grew up in the Seventh-day Adventist Church.

Biography

Oakwood College years
In 1980, Claude McKnight, older brother of R&B musician Brian McKnight, formed an a cappella quartet, The Gentlemen's Estates Quartet, at Oakwood College (now Oakwood University), a Seventh-day Adventist university in Huntsville, Alabama, where he was a freshman. He auditioned students for the group. While rehearsing in a campus bathroom to prepare for a performance, Mark Kibble heard them singing. He joined the harmonizing, adding a fifth part with them onstage that night. Kibble invited Mervyn Warren to join the group, which performed under the name Alliance. Alliance performed in local churches and on campus with a changing roster of members. In 1985, the lower half of the group (bass, baritone, and second tenor) left after graduating. Alvin Chea, Cedric Dent, and David Thomas joined.

Career
The band signed a contract with Warner Alliance in 1987 and changed its name to Take 6 after a search revealed the name "Alliance" was in use. Their self-titled debut album (1988) won Grammy Awards in the gospel and jazz categories and three Dove Awards. They contributed to the film Do the Right Thing and sang on the album Back on the Block by Quincy Jones. They also appeared on Sesame Street and Spike Lee & Company: Do It a Cappella. The band's second album, So Much 2 Say (1990) appeared on the gospel, jazz, and R&B charts of Billboard magazine. The band then signed with Reprise. In 1991, after the release of So Much 2 Say, Mervyn Warren left the group to pursue a career as a record producer and was replaced by Joey Kibble, Mark Kibble's younger brother. The group added instrumentation to their a cappella sound on the album He Is Christmas.

In 2006, the group started the label Take 6 Records; Feels Good, the first album on their new label, was released the same year. In 2007, they recorded with Eros Ramazzotti for his album E². A year later Take 6 released The Standard, which ventured into more traditional jazz territory.

Believe (Sono, 2016), produced by Claude Villani and Ross Vannelli, charted in six categories on Billboard in its first two weeks of release. Iconic (Sono, 2018), produced and arranged by the band, was its first album to chart at No. 1 on the Billboard Contemporary Jazz Chart. The first single was a cover version of "Change the World" by Eric Clapton and debuted on the Contemporary Jazz Song chart in the top 30. The second single, "Sailing", is a cover of the Christopher Cross classic.

Members 

 Claude V. McKnight III – first tenor or first voice (1980–present)
 Mark Kibble – second tenor or second voice (1980–present)
 David Thomas – third tenor or fourth voice (former), third voice (today) (1985–present)
 Joey Kibble  – fourth tenor or third voice (former), fourth voice (today) (1991–present)
 Khristian Dentley  – baritone or fifth voice (2011–present)
 Alvin Chea  – vocal bass or sixth voice (1985–present)

Former
 Mervyn Warren  – third tenor or third voice/first tenor or first voice (song/section dependent) (1980–1991)
 Cedric Dent  – baritone or fifth voice (1985–2011)

Discography

Albums

Live albums

Singles
 1988: "Spread Love" (Reprise)
 1988: "David & Goliath" (Reprise)
 1988: "Milky-White Way" (Reprise)
 1988: "Gold Mine" (Take 6)
 1988: "A Quiet Place"
 1990: "I L-O-V-E U" (Reprise) (No. 19 Hot R&B/Hip-Hop Singles & Tracks)
 1990: "God Rest Ye Merry Gentlemen" (Reprise)
 1990: "Ridin' the Rails" k.d. lang & Take 6) (Sire)
 1991: "Where Do the Children Play"
 1991: "I Believe"
 1994: "Biggest Part of Me" (No. 36 Hot R&B/Hip-Hop Singles & Tracks)
 1994: "All I Need (Is a Chance)"
 1995: "You Can Never Ask Too Much"
 1997: "You Don't Have to Be Afraid"
 1999: "One and the Same (featuring CeCe Winans)" (Reprise)
 2002: "Takin' It to the Streets"
 2006: "Come On" (Take 6)
 2006: "More Than Ever" (Take 6)
 2006: "Comes Love" with Gordon Goodwin's Big Phat Band (XXL)
 2006: "It's Alright With Me" with Gordon Goodwin's Big Phat Band (XXL)
 2006: "It Was a Very Good Year" with Gordon Goodwin's Big Phat Band (The Phat Pack)
 2011: "Never Enough" with Gordon Goodwin's Big Phat Band (That's How We Roll)
 2012: "(It Only Takes) One"
 2015: "When Angels Cry"
 2018: "Sailing"

Video releases

Awards and nominations

Grammy Awards

GMA Dove Award wins

References

External links
 
 Take 6 at Encyclopedia.com
 NAMM Oral History Interview with Alvin Chea January 25, 2013
 NAMM Oral History Interview with Claude McKnight (2013)
 NAMM Oral History Interview with David Thomas (2013)
 NAMM Oral History Interview with Joey Kibble January 25, 2013
 NAMM Oral History interview with Mark Kibble January 25, 2013
 NAMM Oral History Interview with Khristian Dentley (2013)

American gospel musical groups
American jazz ensembles
American Seventh-day Adventists
African-American musical groups
Grammy Award winners
Musical groups established in 1980
Professional a cappella groups
Reprise Records artists
Smooth jazz ensembles
Vocal jazz ensembles